Geertruy Haeck-van Slingelandt van der Tempel was a 15th-century Dutch patrician woman.

Life
Geertruy was married to Adriaen Hermansz. Haeck, who served as mayor of Dordrecht 1443–44 and 1446–48. After being widowed she entered the congregation of canonesses regular of St Agnes (Sint-Agnesklooster).

Portrait
Around 1465 Haeck had her portrait painted kneeling in veneration of St Agnes. This portrait was bought by the Rijksmuseum, Amsterdam, in 1957 for £4,300.

References

Medieval Dutch women
15th-century women of the Holy Roman Empire
People from the county of Holland